TCDD E4000 was the first electric locomotive used by the Turkish State Railways, TCDD. The three units, numbered E4001 - E4003 were built by Alsthom and Jeumont in France. The units are currently disused.

History

In 1955 the first railway in Turkey was electrified, on the  commuter rail from Sirkeci to Halkalı in Istanbul. In addition to delivery of 18 electric multiple units, TCDD wanted to be able to use electrical engines instead of steam engines on long-haul trains on the last few kilometers into Istanbul.

Because the line the locomotives were to serve on was flat and did not allow high speeds, the E4000 was a simple and conservative locomotive, utilizing a direct, single phase AC motor fed directly from the transformer. But even by 1957 the development of rectifiers directly fed AC motors obsolete. The design of the locomotives are based on Paul Arzens of Alsthom, and resemble many of the concurrent locomotives produced by them.

External links
 Trains of Turkey on E4000

E 4000
Bo-Bo locomotives
25 kV AC locomotives
Alstom locomotives
Railway locomotives introduced in 1955
Standard gauge locomotives of Turkey